Ram ki Paidi is a series of ghats on the bank of River Saryu in Ayodhya in the Indian state of Uttar Pradesh. A large number of pilgrims visit every day to take a sacred bath in holy Saryu waters.

The river front brings forth a majestic landscape specially in floodlit night.

There were enormous bathing ghats throughout the banks of the holy river Sarayu and the ones at Nayaghat were immersed in the heavy rains and floods. These were rebuilt in 1985. 

On occasion of Deepawali in 2019 Ayodhya created Guinness world record by lighting 450k Lamp on Ram ki Paidi.

References

External links

government of Uttar Pradesh/Ram ki Paidi

Ayodhya
Ghats of India